Hendrik Alexander van Es Aas (born 14 September 1978), known as Alexander Aas, is a retired Norwegian football defender. Aas spent most of his career playing for Odd Grenland, before moving to Denmark for a two-year spell with Odense. In 2007, he was brought back to Norwegian football by Strømsgodset, where he was club captain until his retirement at the end of the 2012 season. Aas was capped by Norway eight times, scoring one goal.

He was known for his long throw-ins.

Career

Odd Grenland
Alexander Aas came to Odd Grenland from Skiens Grane as a junior player. He got called up to
the main squad in 1996 and made his debut against Hamarkameratene. He played 3 games
during his first season with Odd Grenland (2 league and 1 cup match). At the end of August 1996, he broke his ankle during a training session.

In April 1997, he broke his leg. In 1998, he had his breakthrough in Odd Grenland and played all 26 league matches and
scored 2 goals and helped Odd Grenland secure a spot in Tippeligaen 1999. He also got a spot on the Norway national under-21 football team. Alexander won the 2000 Norwegian Football Cup Final with Odd Grenland. The team's first cup championship in 39 years. In 2000, he had a trial with Southampton.

On September 20, 2001, he was in the starting line-up for Odd Grenland when they played
their first match in the UEFA Cup against Helsingborg. The match ended 2–2 on Odd stadion
and they played 1–1 in Helsingborg. Odd Grenland lost on away goals.

He went on a 10-day trial with Wolverhampton Wanderers in 2004 and played one game for their reserve team.

Odense BK
In January 2005, he signed a two-year contract with Odense. In the summer of 2006, Alexander signed a two-year extension.

Strømsgodset
In December 2006, Odense BK sold Alexander Aas to Strømsgodset IF.

Aalexander Aas took over as captain for Strømsgodset IF in 2008 after Øyvind Leonhardsen retired.

Career statistics

Honours

Club
 Norwegian Football Cup: 2000, 2010
 Danish cup: 2007

References

External links 
 
 
 
 

1978 births
Living people
Sportspeople from Skien
Norwegian footballers
Norway international footballers
Odds BK players
Odense Boldklub players
Strømsgodset Toppfotball players
Eliteserien players
Danish Superliga players
Expatriate men's footballers in Denmark
Norwegian expatriate footballers
Norwegian expatriate sportspeople in Denmark
Association football defenders